Cossacks in the United States or Cossack Americans are American citizens of Cossack descent. A number of them self-identify as Cossacks in the US censuses.  A number of people culturally identify themselves as Cossacks.

Notable people
Serge Jaroff
Emilio Kosterlitzky

References 

 
Cossack diaspora
European-American society
Russian-American history
Ukrainian-American history